Vilém Holáň (23 September 1938 – 5 March 2021) was a Czech politician who served as Minister of Defense for KDU-ČSL from 1994 to 1996, during which he favored Czech accession to NATO. He was an observer to the European Parliament in 2003 and 2004. Holáň was born in Ostrava.

References

1938 births
2021 deaths
KDU-ČSL MPs
KDU-ČSL Government ministers
Defence ministers of the Czech Republic
KDU-ČSL MEPs
MEPs for the Czech Republic 2004
Members of the Chamber of Deputies of the Czech Republic (1996–1998)
Members of the Chamber of Deputies of the Czech Republic (1998–2002)
Members of the Chamber of Deputies of the Czech Republic (2002–2006)
Politicians from Ostrava
Masaryk University alumni